Rare & Fatty is a compilation album by British 2 Tone and ska band Bad Manners, released on 9 February 1999.

Track listing
 "Paranoid"
 "Devil's Dub"
 "Tighten Up"
 "Jezebel"
 "Elizabethan Reggae" (Original Version)
 "Boots"
 "Double Barrel"
 "Are You Monster?"
 "Why Wait"
 "Help Me"
 "Shakin' up (Downing Street)"
 "When Will I See You Again"
 "Night Bus to Dalston" (Original Version)
 "That'll Do Nicely" (Rare Mix)
 "Truckin'"
 "(Untitled Hidden Track)"

Note: "That'll Do Nicely" remix is the "Dub Mix" from the US 12" 

1999 compilation albums
Bad Manners albums
Moon Ska Records compilation albums